Nazari is a surname and given name of Persian and Italian origins, meaning in Persian "Son of Nazar" (a given name) or "(son) of Nazareth". The name comes from the town Nazareth, where Jesus spent his youth.

Notable people with the surname Nazari

 Bartolomeo Nazari, Italian painter, Venetian school (b. 1699, Clusone, d. 1758, Milano)
 Omid Nazari, Iranian footballer
 Amin Nazari, Swedish footballer
 Hassan Nazari, Iranian footballer
 Luigi Nazari di Calabiana, Italian churchman
 Mostafa Nazari, Iranian futsal player
 Wahed Nazari, Afghan film director

Notable people with the given name Nazari
 Nazariy Yaremchuk, Ukraininan singer

See also
 Nasrid dynasty

Persian-language surnames
Italian-language surnames